Plovdiv Central Railway Station is the main railway station serving the city and municipality of Plovdiv, the second most populous city in Bulgaria.

History 
Opened in the 1870s, the station is located on the Lyubimets–Belovo railway, which links Sofia, capital of Bulgaria, with Istanbul, largest city of Turkey. It was built by Turkish architect Mimar Kemaleddin Bey.

There are 11 tracks in the station. The current Art Nouveau building, designed by the Italian architect professor Mariano Pernigoni, was completed in 1908.

Gallery

See also
 Bulgarian State Railways

References

External links

Central Railway Station
Railway stations in Bulgaria
Mimar Kemaleddin buildings